Somerset, Nova Scotia could mean the following:

Somerset in Kings County
Somerset in Lunenburg County